Certhiaxis is a genus of Neotropical birds in the ovenbird family Furnariidae.

Taxonomy
The genus Certhiaxis was introduced in 1844 by the French naturalist René Lesson with the yellow-chinned spinetail as the type species. The name is a combination of the genus Certhia that was introduced by Carl Linnaeus in 1758 for the treecreepers and the genus Synallaxis that was introduced by Louis Jean Pierre Vieillot in 1818 for the spinetails.

The genus contains two species:

References

 
Bird genera
Taxa named by René Lesson
Taxonomy articles created by Polbot